Gulliver's Valley is a theme park and resort located in Rotherham, England.  Construction began in 2018 at a planned cost of £37 million. The first phase, costing £7.5 million, was due to open in spring 2020 but the opening was delayed due to the coronavirus pandemic. The park officially opened on 11 July 2020.

Gulliver's Valley has sister parks at Warrington (Gulliver's World), Matlock Bath (Gulliver's Kingdom) and Milton Keynes (Gulliver's Land).

Attractions
The park is aimed at families with children aged 2 to 13.

References

External links

Official Website

Amusement parks in England
Tourist attractions in Sheffield
2020 establishments in England
Amusement parks opened in 2020